Nomadness is the ninth studio album by English band Strawbs. It was their last album recorded for A&M Records and their first with no full-time keyboard player since 1970's Dragonfly. Indeed, Strawbs would not feature a full-time keyboard player until 1978 when Andy Richards joined the band. All the tracks are timed at less than five minutes giving the album a lighter, less 'epic' feel in contrast to the previous three studio albums. Rick Wakeman came back to help on electric harpsichord on one song.

Track listing
Side one
"To Be Free" (Dave Cousins) – 4:17
"Little Sleepy" (Dave Lambert) – 4:10
"The Golden Salamander" (Cousins) – 4:57
"Absent Friend (How I Need You)" (Cousins) – 4:42
"Back on the Farm" (Cousins) – 2:42

Side two
"So Shall Our Love Die?" (Cousins) – 3:39
"Tokyo Rosie" (Cousins) – 2:48
"A Mind of My Own" (Rod Coombes) – 4:33
"Hanging in the Gallery" (Cousins) – 4:32
"The Promised Land" (Chas Cronk) – 4:07

Bonus tracks - 2008 reissue CD
"Still Small Voice" (Cousins) – 2:27
"It's Good to See the Sun" (Cousins) – 4:05

Personnel
Dave Cousins – lead vocals, (Side 1: tracks 1, 3, 4. Side 2: 1, 2 4, 5) backing vocals, acoustic guitar, dulcimer, banjo
Dave Lambert – lead vocals (Side 1: tracks 2, 5. Side 2: 3, 5), backing vocals, acoustic guitar, electric guitar
Chas Cronk – backing vocals, bass guitar
Rod Coombes – backing vocals, drums, acoustic guitar

Additional personnel
John Mealing – piano (Side 1 : Track 4 Side 2 : Track 1), organ (Side 1 : Tracks 1, 4, 5 Side 2 : Tracks 4, 5), electric piano (Side 1 : Track 2)
Tony Carr – congas
Jack Emblow – accordion (Side 1 : track 5)
Tommy Eyre – piano (Side 2 : Tracks 3, 5), clavinet (Side 2 :  Track 3), synthesizer (Side 2 : track 3)
John Lumley-Saville – synthesizer (Side 2 : Track 4)
Rick Wakeman – electric harpsichord (Side 2 : track 2)
Tom Allom – cymbalum (Side 2 : track 2)

Recording

Tom Allom – Producer
Vic Gamm – Engineer

Recorded at Sound Techniques, London

Release history

References

Nomadness on Strawbsweb
Sleeve notes AMLH 68331 Nomadness
Sleeve notes 5302822 Nomadness

Notes

Strawbs albums
1975 albums
Albums produced by Tom Allom
A&M Records albums